Seyfabad (also Romanized as Seyfābād and Saifābād) is a village in Kuhenjan Rural District, Kuhenjan District, Sarvestan County, Fars Province, Iran. At the 2006 census, its population was 1,122, in 273 families.

References 

Populated places in Sarvestan County